Alevtina Sergeyevna Olyunina (born 15 August 1942 in Pchyolkino, Kostroma Oblast, Russian SFSR) is a female Soviet former cross-country skier who competed during the early 1970s for Trud Voluntary Sports Society.

She won two medals at the 1972 Winter Olympics in Sapporo with a gold in the 3 × 5 km relay and a silver in the 10 km.

Olyunina also won two medals at the 1970 FIS Nordic World Ski Championships with golds both in the 10 km and the 3 × 5 km relay events.

Cross-country skiing results
All results are sourced from the International Ski Federation (FIS).

Olympic Games
 2 medals – (1 gold, 1 silver)

World Championships
 2 medals – (2 gold)

References

External links
 
 
 

1942 births
Living people
People from Kostroma Oblast
Soviet female cross-country skiers
Russian female cross-country skiers
Cross-country skiers at the 1968 Winter Olympics
Cross-country skiers at the 1972 Winter Olympics
Olympic cross-country skiers of the Soviet Union
Olympic gold medalists for the Soviet Union
Olympic silver medalists for the Soviet Union
Olympic medalists in cross-country skiing
FIS Nordic World Ski Championships medalists in cross-country skiing
Medalists at the 1972 Winter Olympics
Universiade medalists in cross-country skiing
Universiade silver medalists for the Soviet Union
Competitors at the 1970 Winter Universiade
Sportspeople from Kostroma Oblast